Estonian Wushu Kungfu Federation (abbreviation EWKF) is one of the sport governing bodies in Estonia which deals with wushu and kungfu.

EWKF was established in 2005. EWKF is a member of  Estonian Olympic Committee.

References

External links
 
 Old homepage

Sports governing bodies in Estonia
Martial arts in Estonia
Sports organizations established in 2005
2005 establishments in Estonia